The Wicked Fairy is the antagonist of Sleeping Beauty. In some adaptations she is known as Carabosse, and she is named Maleficent in Walt Disney media.

Role in the tale 
In Charles Perrault's Sleeping Beauty, published in 1697 in Histoires ou contes du temps passé , a king and queen celebrate their daughter's christening by inviting seven fairies and give them each a golden case with a jeweled knife, fork and spoon. However, an eighth, older fairy is forgotten. When she shows up they hastily welcome her, but do not have a golden case to give her. Infuriated, the old fairy curses the princess to die from wounding her hand on a spindle. Another fairy mitigates the curse so that the princess will only fall into a deep sleep and the king attempts to protect her by removing all spindles. When the princess is fifteen or sixteen, she meets a spinning woman, pricks her finger on the bodkin, and falls into a deep sleep.

In the Brothers Grimm version, Little Brier-Rose, the king intentionally does not invite the thirteenth fairy (or, depending on translation, wise woman) because he doesn't have enough golden plates. She shows up at the christening anyway, angry at not being invited. She declares that "because you did not invite me, I tell you that in her fifteenth year, your daughter will prick herself with a spindle and fall over dead".

Origins 
Some renditions of Sleeping Beauty include a fairy godmother and others do not. There are no fairy godmothers in Sleeping Beauty's predecessor Sun, Moon, and Talia from Giambattista Basile's Pentamerone (1634). Talia's fate is prophesied by wise men, but her fate is not caused by magic. In the same collection, in The Young Slave, the heroine Lisa is raised by fairies. All of them give gifts to Lisa, but one twists her ankle and curses Lisa to "die" via a comb in her hair.

The French romance Perceforest, which dates to at least 1528 and probably earlier, features a segment similar to Sleeping Beauty. The aunt of the newborn Zellandine is given the task of setting a table with food for three goddesses: Venus, Lucina, and Themis. These goddesses oversee the birth and bless the child, much like the Fates of mythology. However, Themis's knife accidentally falls under the table. Not seeing it, and thinking she has been left out, Themis curses Zellandine to prick her finger with spinning flax and fall asleep forever. Venus softens the curse so that Zellandine's lover can wake her.

The figure of an insulted fairy seems to have originated outside this story type. In the 13th-century French play Le Jeu de la Feuillée by Adam de la Halle, a table is set for three fairies named Morgue, Arsile and Maglore. Morgue and Arsile are pleased and bestow blessings of good fortune on the men who set the table, but Maglore is angry that her place is missing a knife, and curses the men with bad fortune. Katharine Briggs suggests that this is "the model for all subsequent fairies' visits." 

Similarly in the early 13th century, in the chanson de geste , the dwarf-sized elf-king Oberon explains to Huon that an angry fairy cursed him to that size at his christening after she felt she was not honored as well as the other fairies there.   

Other wicked fairy godmothers appeared in unrelated tales. Several feature in the stories of Madame d'Aulnoy, who invented the term fairy tale. These include The Hind in the Wood, The Princess Mayblossom (where a wicked fairy named Carabosse curses an infant princess with unhappiness, due to an old grudge against the princess's father) and The Blue Bird (where the villain's fairy godmother is named Mazilla). In Charlotte-Rose de Caumont de La Force's Fairer-Than-A-Fairy (1698), a cruel fairy queen is named Nabote. In the Chevalier de Mailly's Fairer-Than-A-Fairy, a malicious old fairy named Lagrée kidnaps the heroine.

Analysis 
Some folklorists have analyzed Sleeping Beauty as indicating the replacement of the lunar year (with its thirteen months, symbolically depicted by the full thirteen fairies) by the solar year (which has twelve, symbolically the invited fairies).  This, however, founders on the issue that only in the Grimms' tale is the wicked fairy godmother or the thirteenth fairy; in Perrault's, she is the eighth fairy.

Revisions

The wicked fairy godmother is widely spoofed, parodied, and used in revisionist fairy tales. In Andrew Lang's Prince Prigio, the queen, who does not believe in fairies, does not invite them; the fairies come anyway and give good gifts, except for the last one, who says that he shall be "too clever"—and the problems with such a gift are only revealed later. In Patricia Wrede's Enchanted Forest Chronicles, a princess lamented that she was not cursed at her christening because the fairy danced with her uncle and enjoyed herself instead of getting angry. 

George MacDonald's fairy tale Little Daylight plays with the concept of the last fairy mitigating the curse: the swamp fairy adds more conditions claiming that she was interrupted before she was done, but the other fairies had wisely kept a second fairy in reserve, who is then able to change the curse. Another of MacDonald's stories, The Light Princess, features a similar character in the king's sister, Princess Makemnoit, who is not invited to his daughter's christening. Makemnoit arrives without an invitation and curses the princess to have no gravity. It is discovered that water makes the princess regain her gravity, so Makemnoit drains the water from the lake, making even the rain cease and babies cry no tears. Makemnoit eventually meets her fate when her house is undermined by the waters and falls in, drowning her.

In other media

Theater 

 In Marius Petipa's ballet Sleeping Beauty, with music composed by Tchaikovsky, the wicked fairy is named Carabosse. She is portrayed as a frightening figure, entering each time to foreboding and dramatic music. Instead of the spinster being an innocent bystander, she is actually Carabosse in disguise. Not originally connected to the Sleeping Beauty story, the name Carabosse had previously appeared in Madame d'Aulnoy's fairy tale The Princess Mayblossom. 
 The ballet The Sleeping Beauty in 1921, produced by Sergei Diaghilev, employed the original choreography by Marius Petipa as it was painstakingly recalled by several of its dancers, all now émigrés. Carabosse's costumes were designed by Léon Bakst; her medieval-inspired costume gave her the silhouette of a rat.
 In Matthew Bourne's 21st-century reimagining of the ballet, the king and queen, driven by despair, seek her help who gives them a daughter named Aurora; however, the king forgets to express his gratitude and she curses the child. Years later when Aurora is in her early twenties, Carabosse has died in exile but her son Caradoc attempts to exact revenge and seduce Aurora.

Film 

 In Disney's 1959 animated version of Sleeping Beauty, the wicked fairy Maleficent is a dark, almost Satan-like figure who calls herself the "Mistress of all Evil". When not invited to the royal christening, she lays a curse on the princess (named Aurora here, as in Tchaikovsky's ballet) to die on her sixteenth birthday for not being invited to her christening. The third fairy weakens the curse to just fall into a deep sleep, but the three good fairies still take baby Aurora with them to live in the woods for her protection. Meanwhile her father, King Stefan, has ordered all spinning wheels in the country burned. Maleficent's monstrous minions hunt for Aurora for the next sixteen years and on her sixteenth birthday, Aurora returns to the palace and pricks her finger on the spindle of a spinning wheel magically conjured up by Maleficent. When Maleficent learns that Prince Phillip is in love with Princess Aurora, she captures him so that he will be too old and feeble when he can finally free Aurora. When the good fairies help him escape, Maleficent takes over the entire palace and later transforms into a giant black dragon to do battle with the hero. Prince Phillip defeats the villainess with his Sword of Truth.
 The 2014 film Maleficent reinvented her as a tragic villain who curses Aurora in order to exact revenge against Aurora's father, King Stefan. Stefan broke Maleficent's heart and cut off her wings, an act of betrayal that turned her bitter and wicked. However, Maleficent starts to care for the child as if she was her own daughter and begins to question her own actions. In the end, it is her kiss of true love on the head that frees Aurora from the curse, concluding Maleficent's path of redemption. A sequel, Maleficent: Mistress of Evil, was released in 2019.
 The wicked fairy godmother is named Odelia in Jetlag Productions' Sleeping Beauty. This version closely follows the original fairy tales. At the end, Prince Richard overcomes the many obstacles to reach the sleeping Princess Felicity and put an end to Odelia's curse. Odelia is killed by the spirit of the seventh fairy godmother, who lost all powers to put the castle to sleep and spent hundred years and one day as pink-red rose.

Literature 

 In Orson Scott Card's Enchantment (1999), Baba Yaga fills the role of the wicked fairy.
 In Robin McKinley's Spindle's End, the wicked fairy is named Pernicia. Similar to the original fairy tale, Pernicia appears on the princess' name-day and places a curse on the baby, claiming that the child will, on her 21st birthday, prick her finger on a spindle and fall into deathly sleep. A powerful fairy named Ikor switches the identities of the princess, named Rosie, and her best friend Peony, to break Pernicia's spell when Rosie turns 21.
 In Mercedes Lackey's The Gates of Sleep (2002), the baby's paternal aunt Arachne curses her to die on her 18th birthday, even though Arachne was not supposed to possess any magical ability at all. The girl, named Marina, remains hidden during 17 and a half years until Arachne murders her parents and takes Marina with her. At some point, the curse is broken but Arachne manages to re-instate the curse, resulting in a battle between Marina and Arachne.
 Heather Walther's Malice (2021) reimagines the Sleeping Beauty story with a romance between the princess and the evil sorceress characters.

See also

 Fairy godmother
 Queen (Snow White)
 Weaving (mythology)
 Hag
 Crone
 The Witch (fairy tale)

References

Literary characters introduced in 1697
Female characters in fairy tales
Female literary villains
Fictional characters without a name
Fictional fairies and sprites
Fictional shapeshifters
Sleeping Beauty characters